The European Parliament election of 2009 took place on 6–7 June 2009.

The Democratic Party allied with Italy of Values, and the Radicals was the largest party coalition with 47.1%.

Results
Source: Ministry of the Interior

2009 elections in Italy
Elections in Sardinia
European Parliament elections in Italy
2009 European Parliament election